Olm is a village in the commune of Kehlen, in western Luxembourg.

Footnotes

Kehlen
Villages in Luxembourg